Àlex Corretja was the defending champion but lost in the second round to Stefan Koubek.

Nicolás Lapentti won in the final 1–6, 6–4, 7–5, 7–5 against Albert Costa.

Seeds
A champion seed is indicated in bold text while text in italics indicates the round in which that seed was eliminated. All sixteen seeds received a bye to the second round.

  Juan Carlos Ferrero (quarterfinals)
  Yevgeny Kafelnikov (third round)
  Àlex Corretja (second round)
  Franco Squillari (third round)
  Guillermo Coria (semifinals)
  Nicolás Lapentti (champion)
  Guillermo Cañas (second round)
  Alberto Martín (third round)
  Gastón Gaudio (third round)
  Álex Calatrava (third round)
  Andrei Pavel (quarterfinals)
  Wayne Arthurs (second round, retired)
  Rainer Schüttler (third round)
  Andrea Gaudenzi (withdrew because of a torn right leg muscle)
  Fernando Vicente (second round)
  Francisco Clavet (second round)

Draw

Finals

Top half

Section 1

Section 2

Bottom half

Section 3

Section 4

References
 2001 Generali Open Draw

Austrian Open Kitzbühel
2001 ATP Tour